Hinke Maria Osinga (born 25 December 1969) is a Dutch mathematician and an expert in dynamical systems. She works as a professor of applied mathematics at the University of Auckland in New Zealand. As well as for her research, she is known as a creator of mathematical art.

Education and career
Osinga earned a master's degree in 1991 and a Ph.D. in 1996 from the University of Groningen. Her doctoral dissertation, jointly supervised by dynamical systems theorist Henk Broer and computational geometer Gert Vegter, was on the computation of invariant manifolds. 

After postdoctoral studies at The Geometry Center and the California Institute of Technology, and a short-term lecturership at the University of Exeter, she became a lecturer at the University of Bristol in 2001, and was promoted to reader and professor there in 2005 and 2011, respectively. She moved to Auckland in 2011, becoming the first female mathematics professor at Auckland and the second in New Zealand.

Mathematical art
In 2004 Osinga created a crocheted visualization of the Lorenz manifold, an invariant manifold for the Lorenz system, and published the crochet pattern for her work with her husband Bernd Krauskopf; the resulting mathematical textile artwork involved over 25,000 crochet stitches, and measured nearly a meter across. Osinga and Krauskopf later collaborated with artist Benjamin Storch on a stainless steel sculpture that provides another interpretation of the same mathematical system.

Awards and honours
Osinga was an invited speaker at the International Congress of Mathematicians in 2014, speaking on "Mathematics in Science and Technology". In 2015 she was elected as a fellow of the Society for Industrial and Applied Mathematics "for contributions to theory and computational methods for dynamical systems."  In October 2016 she became the first female mathematician elected to the Royal Society of New Zealand.

In 2017 Osinga was selected as one of the Royal Society Te Apārangi's "150 women in 150 words", celebrating the contributions of women to knowledge in New Zealand. The same year she received the Moyal Medal from Macquarie University.

Selected publications

References

External links
 

1969 births
Living people
Dutch women mathematicians
New Zealand women mathematicians
University of Groningen alumni
Academic staff of the University of Auckland
Fellows of the Society for Industrial and Applied Mathematics
Mathematical artists
Dutch women artists
Dynamical systems theorists
People from Dokkum
Dutch emigrants to New Zealand
21st-century New Zealand mathematicians
Academics of the University of Exeter
Academics of the University of Bristol